Gerald Patterson and Suzanne Lenglen defeated defending champions Randolph Lycett and Elizabeth Ryan in the final, 7–5, 6–3 to win the mixed doubles tennis title at the 1920 Wimbledon Championships.

Draw

Finals

Top half

Section 1

Section 2

The nationality of Mrs M Blythman is unknown.

Bottom half

Section 3

The nationalities of Miss AL Lister and Mme Paravicini is unknown.

Section 4

The nationality of Mme AH Gobert is unknown.

References

External links

X=Mixed Doubles
Wimbledon Championship by year – Mixed doubles